Alex Saffy (born 1 October 2005) is an Australian swimmer. He won a bronze medal at the 2022 World Para Swimming Championships and a silver medal at the 2022 Commonwealth Games.

Personal 
Saffy was born on 1 October 2005 at Port Elizabeth, South Africa. He was diagnosed with dyskinetic cerebral palsy when he was 12 years old. He was a top age group swimmer until switching to para in 2020 due to regular disqualifications. His family moved from South Africa to Bunbury, Western Australia. He attended Bunbury Catholic College.

Swimming 
Saffy originally swam and played field hockey and then quit hockey due to his swim training commitments. His cerebral palsy meant that he was regularly disqualified during able bodied swimming competitions.<ref name=":0" /. He moved to para swimming and is a member of the Bunbury Swim Club. He is classified as an S10 swimmer. Whilst setting qualifying times, he was unable to compete at the 2020 Tokyo Paralympics as he did not have an international classification.

At his first major international competition - 2022 World Para Swimming Championships in Madeira, he won the bronze medal in the Men's 100 m Butterfly S10 and finished seventh in the Men's 200 m Individual Medley SM10.

At the 2022 Commonwealth Games in Birmingham, England, he won the silver medal in the Men's 100 m butterfly S10.

Recognition 

 2021 - Wally Foreman Foundation Scholarship
 2022 - Western Australian Institute of Sport Young Athlete of the Year
 2023 Sport Australia Hall of Fame Scholarship and Mentoring Program - Tier 2 Scholarship

References

External links 
 Commonwealth Games Australia profile

2005 births
Living people
Male Paralympic swimmers of Australia
S10-classified Paralympic swimmers
People from Bunbury, Western Australia
Medalists at the World Para Swimming Championships
Swimmers at the 2022 Commonwealth Games
Commonwealth Games medallists in swimming
Commonwealth Games silver medallists for Australia
21st-century Australian people
Medallists at the 2022 Commonwealth Games